17 Carat is the debut extended play by South Korean boy group Seventeen. It was released on May 29, 2015, by Pledis Entertainment and distributed by LOEN Entertainment. "Adore U" serves as the lead single for the extended play.

Background and release
The extended play includes 5 tracks written, co-written and co-produced by Seventeen's group members. "Adore U" was chosen as the lead single for the EP and was performed on multiple music shows by the group. "Shining Diamond" was used as a pre-single on the group's reality debut show. The group states that the track list was chosen to reflect the group's core concept of "boys' passion". The album has two physical versions: one with a "black" themed photo card set and the other with a "white" themed photo card set. All copies include a CD containing the songs and a fold up poster/lyric sheet.

Single
"Adore U" is the lead single of the extended play. It was written by Woozi, S.Coups, and Yeon Dong-geon. The Korea Herald states "'Adore U' is a funky pop song about a teenage boy trying to navigate through puppy love." It marks the beginning of the group's trilogy composed of the singles Adore U, Mansae and Pretty U about a boy meeting, falling in love and asking out a girl. The track was composed and arranged by Woozi, Bumzu, and Yeon Dong-geon. The music video for the single was released on May 29, 2015 and was directed by Dee Shin. The dance choreography accompaniment to the song was choreographed by Hoshi of Seventeen and focuses on "storytelling, and on highlighting each member's strengths onstage". The single has sold more than 38,000 digital copies and peaked at number 13 on the Billboard US World Chart.

Commercial Performance
The EP has sold 82,972+ copies in South Korea. It peaked at number 4 on the Korean Gaon Chart and number 8 on the US World Billboard Chart.

Accolades

Listicles

Track listing 
Hoshi participated in the choreography of "Adore U" and "Shining Diamond", Dino choreographed "Jam Jam".

References 

2015 debut EPs
Korean-language EPs
Kakao M EPs
Seventeen (South Korean band) EPs
Hybe Corporation EPs